Anacardioideae is a subfamily of plants in the family Anacardiaceae.

Genera
The following genera are recognised:

References

Bibliography

External links
  

Anacardiaceae
Rosid subfamilies